The Pong Dam, also known as the Beas Dam, is an earth-fill embankment dam on the Beas River in the state of Himachal Pradesh, India, just upstream of Talwara. The purpose of the dam is water storage for irrigation and hydroelectric power generation. As the second phase of the Beas Project, construction on the dam began in 1961 and was completed in 1974. At the time of its completion, the Pong Dam was the tallest of its type in India. The lake created by the dam, Maharana Pratap Sagar, became a renowned bird sanctuary.

Background
The idea for a dam on the Beas at the Pong site was first proposed in 1926 and subsequent surveys of the Indus River and its tributaries were ordered by the Punjab Government in 1927. Interest in the dam declined after the report deemed the project difficult because of flood waters. In 1955, geological and hydrological studies were carried out on the Pong site and an embankment design was recommended. In 1959, extensive studies were carried out and recommended an embankment dam with a gravity section. A final design was issued and construction began in 1961 on the dam which was called Beas Project Unit II - Beas Dam. About 150,000 people were displaced by the dam's large reservoir under a poorly planned and executed relocation program.

Design
The dam's spillway is located on its southern bank and is a chute-type controlled by six radial gates. Located at the base of the dam is its power house. It is supplied with water via three penstocks which each meet a 66 MW Francis turbine-generator located inside the Bhatoli phakorian.

Displacement of people 
The large reservoir created by this dam resulted in a major displacement of people from the state of Himachal Pradesh. A total of 90,702 people were displaced and 339 villages affected. The displaced people were to be resettled in Rajasthan. However, as of February 2014, 9732 requests for land allotment were still pending. Himachal Pradesh threatened Rajasthan that they will file a contempt of court in Supreme Court if land is not allotted.

See also

Bhakra Dam
Pandoh Dam

References

Dams in Himachal Pradesh
Hydroelectric power stations in Himachal Pradesh
Earth-filled dams
Dams completed in 1974
Dams on the Beas River
Embankment dams
Buildings and structures in Kangra district
1974 establishments in Himachal Pradesh
20th-century architecture in India